Stand Back! Here Comes Charley Musselwhite's South Side Band is the 1967 debut album of American blues-harp musician Charlie Musselwhite, leading Charlie Musselwhite's Southside Band. The Vanguard Records release brought Musselwhite to notability among blues musicians and also helped bridge the gap between blues and rock and roll, musically and in marketing. With rough vocals and notable performances on harmonica, guitar and bass guitar, the album was critically well received. It introduced Musselwhite's signature song, his cover of Duke Pearson's "Cristo Redemptor".

Critical reception and influence

The album has been critically well-received, described as  "legendary", "seminal", and "one of the classic blues albums of the decade." Its success established Musselwhite in the field of blues music, but it also influenced rock and roll. The Southside Band, named for Chicago's South Side, was a combination of blues rhythm section—with Fred Below and Bob Anderson—and rock-influenced musicians Barry Goldberg and Harvey Mandel. Among the first blues albums targeted also to fans of rock and roll, it was influential in bridging the gap between blues and rock. The album's success allowed Musselwhite to launch a career as a full-time musician, relocating from Chicago to California, and also secured his reputation as a harmonica player whose collaborations have included Muddy Waters, Howlin' Wolf, Tom Waits, Ben Harper, Cyndi Lauper and INXS. The album is among Musselwhite's most successful.

Music
Among the album's tracks, "Cristo Redemptor" has remained particularly important in Musselwhite's repertoire, standing as his signature song, although subsequent versions of the Duke Pearson cover have been longer. Musselwhite's music here is characterized by smooth harmonica a "harsh, almost strained voice" that Allmusic indicates is "considerably more affected than...later [vocals] (clearer, more relaxed)". Mandel's guitar work, influential, features what Legends of Rock Guitar describes as "relentless fuzztone, feedback-edged solos, and unusual syncopated phrasing." Allmusic highlights the guitarist's "snakey stuttering style", particularly on track "Chicken Shack" in which it "truly makes you think your record is skipping." Bass player Bob Anderson, who later played with Howlin' Wolf, has been singled out for a noteworthy rendition of the classic root-3rd-4th progression in the song "Help Me".

Release history
First released in 1967 on Vanguard Records, catalogue numbers VRS-9232 (monaural) and VSD-79232 (stereo), the album has been re-released several times on LP and CD by Vanguard and Ace.

Track listing
Unless otherwise indicated, the composer is uncredited.
"Baby Will You Please Help Me" (Charlie Musselwhite) – 3:20
"No More Lonely Nights"  – 5:14
"Cha Cha the Blues"  – 3:13
"Christo Redemptor" (Duke Pearson) – 3:21
"Help Me" (Carreras, Farver, Ed Ward) – 3:29
"Chicken Shack" – 4:17
"Strange Land" (Musselwhite) – 3:04
"39th and Indiana" (Musselwhite) – 4:12
"My Baby" – 2:46
"Early in the Morning" – 4:31
"4 P.M." (Harvey Mandel) – 3:17
"Sad Day" (Barry Goldberg) – 5:04

Personnel
Bob Anderson – bass
Fred Below – drums
Samuel Charters – producer
Barry Goldberg – organ, guitar, piano, keyboards, producer
Harvey Mandel – guitar
Charlie Musselwhite – guitar, harmonica, vocals, performer
Pete Welding – liner notes

References

Charlie Musselwhite albums
1966 debut albums
Albums produced by Samuel Charters
Vanguard Records albums